Jon Koznick (born July 4, 1972) is an American politician serving in the Minnesota House of Representatives since 2015. A member of the Republican Party of Minnesota, Koznick represents District 58A in the southern Twin Cities metropolitan area, which includes the city of Lakeville and parts of Dakota and Scott Counties.

Early life
Koznick was born in Colombia. He attended St. Cloud State University, graduating with a B.S in marketing.

Minnesota House of Representatives
Koznick was elected to the Minnesota House of Representatives in 2014, after incumbent Mary Liz Holberg retired, and has been reelected every two years since. In 2019-20, he served as an assistant minority leader for the House Republican Caucus. Koznick is the minority lead on the Economic Development Finance and Policy Committee and sits on the State and Local Government Finance and Policy and Taxes Committees.

Electoral history

Personal life
Koznick is married to his wife, Patty. They have two children and reside in Lakeville, Minnesota.

References

External links

 Rep. Jon Koznick official Minnesota House of Representatives website

1972 births
Living people
Republican Party members of the Minnesota House of Representatives
21st-century American politicians
People from Lakeville, Minnesota
American politicians of Colombian descent